SOIC may stand for:

 Ship and Ocean Industries R&D Center, a research center in Taiwan
Small outline integrated circuit: a carrier which occupies an area about 30 - 50% less than an equivalent DIP, with a typical thickness that is 70% less;
Svenska Ostindiska Companiet: the Swedish East India Company, founded by Scot Colin Campbell